Dahgawan is a Block and a nagar panchayat in Dahgawan block, Badaun District in the Indian state of Uttar Pradesh. 0179 is the block number of Dahgavan.

References

Cities and towns in Budaun district
Blocks in Budaun District